Dersimiz: Atatürk is a 2010 Turkish biographical film directed by Hamdi Alkan based on the life of Mustafa Kemal Atatürk.

Production
The film was shot on location in Ankara, Çanakkale and Istanbul, Turkey.

Plot 
A group of primary school students are assigned homework for which they will have to study the life of Mustafa Kemal Atatürk, the founder of the Turkish Republic. An elderly historian will lead the way during the kids’ exploration of Atatürk’s life story, telling them everything about his childhood, his years as a student and his military career, and also taking the kids on a virtual journey among the most important fronts fought during the Turkish War of Independence.

Cast
 Halit Ergenç as Kemal Atatürk
 Çetin Tekindor as Historian Grandfather
 Doğa Rutkay as Latife Hanım

Release
The film opened in 259 screens across Turkey  at number two in the Turkish box office chart with an opening weekend gross of $527,066.

Reception

Box office
The movie has made a total gross of $2,230,496.

See also 
 2010 in film
 Turkish films of 2010
 Mustafa a 2008 biographical film directed by Can Dündar
 Veda a 2010 biographical film directed by Zülfü Livaneli

References

External links
 

2010 films
2010s Turkish-language films
2010 biographical drama films
Films set in Turkey
Cultural depictions of Mustafa Kemal Atatürk
Turkish War of Independence films
Turkish biographical drama films
2010 drama films